Haigh Hall Miniature Railway (HHMR) is a  gauge miniature railway, situated in the grounds of Haigh Country Park in Haigh, Greater Manchester, England.

The railway officially re-opened on 20 April 2014, but it had run trains under a new operator since late July 2013, running shuttle services between two stations; Haigh Hall North and Haigh Hall South. The full  circuit was re-opened in early 2014. The railway first opened in 1986 under different operators; it runs over the same general track layout, but some alterations have been made over time.

HHMR's two resident locomotives are Helen and Rachel, they have been a part of the railway for some time. The Railway recently took delivery of two new locomotives from the Cleethorpes Coast Light Railway; The Cub (otherwise known as John) and KD-1. KD-1 is a long term restoration project, but The Cub is on loan to Haigh Hall for a general overhaul and running in.

KD-1 was previously known as the Rapido Railcar. It is under a fast-track overhaul to a fully operational locomotive. It was once part of a four-car unit, the three other carriages are beyond repair, so they are being stripped of parts in order to make KD-1 serviceable as a locomotive. What is left of the other vehicles will be used as flat wagons for the railway's permanent-way train.

The railway runs passenger services 11am - 4 pm Saturdays, Sundays, Bank Holidays and school holidays. Tickets cost £1 for all ages and free for under 2 year olds.

References

Sources

External links
 Haigh Hall Miniature Railway - official Facebook site
 Haigh Hall Miniature Railway 15 inch - Miniature Railway World

Miniature railways in the United Kingdom
15 in gauge railways in England
Tourist attractions in Greater Manchester